The Outlaws Motorcycle Club, incorporated as the American Outlaws Association or its acronym, A.O.A., is an outlaw motorcycle club that was formed in McCook, Illinois in 1935. It is one of the largest outlaw motorcycle clubs in the world and historic arch-rival of the Hells Angels.

Membership in the Outlaws is limited to men who own American-made motorcycles of a particular size. Their main rivals are the Hells Angels, giving rise to a phrase used by Outlaws members, "ADIOS" (the Spanish word for "goodbye", but in this case doubling as an acronym for "Angels Die In Outlaw States").

In April 2021, Assistant U.S. Attorney Joseph M. Tripi alleged in court papers that the international president of the Outlaws Motorcycle Club is John Ermin, the general manager of Pharaoh's Gentlemen's Club in Cheektowaga, NY.

History

The Outlaws Motorcycle Club was established out of Matilda's Bar on old Route 66 in McCook, Illinois, a southwestern suburb of Chicago, in 1935. The club stayed together during World War II, but like most organizations at that time, their activities were limited.

In the 1950s, the club's logo was changed; a small skull replaced a winged motorcycle, and Old English-style letters were adopted. This design was embroidered on a black shirt and hand painted on leather jackets. In 1954, the Crossed Pistons were added to the original small skull. This design was embroidered on a black western-style shirt with white piping. The movie The Wild One with Marlon Brando influenced this backpatch. The Skull and Crossed Pistons were redesigned in 1959, making them much larger with more detail. The A.O.A. logo was adopted as an answer to the A.M.A. logo.

The club featured in a work of photojournalism called The Bikeriders published in 1967 by Danny Lyon, a collection of photographs and interviews documenting the lifestyle of members of the club in the early 1960s.

In Canada the club claims 21 chapters in seven provinces, including their Nomads Canada chapter.

In England and Wales the club has around 30 different chapters.

In New Zealand the club has chapters in the cities of Napier, Blenheim and Christchurch.

Support clubs
The Outlaws also manage and maintain a number of support clubs.

War Dogs MC Portugal 
Alimus MC Philippines
15 Crew
15 Bastards MC
Berserker Bikers
Black & White Crew
Black Legion
Black Pistons MC
Black Riders MC Philippines
Black Skulls MC
Black Riders MC
Black Venom
BOAR MC
Border Riders MC
Chosen Few MC
Dead Eyes MC
Filthy 15
Friends & Family MC
Handful MC
Horse Creek MC
Iron Breed MC
Keltics MC
Knights of Sin MC
Legacy MC
Mandingos SC
Manila Klasiko MC Philippines
New Attitudes MC
Overlords MC
Piston Pirates MC
Randomers
Rat Bobbers MC
Reapers MC
Road Runners MC
Rotten MC
Rough Creed MC
Southern undeniables
Steel Pistons
Southern Saints
Throttle Brothers MC
Trogs MC
Wilde Horde
Wolf Pack MC
Wolverine-Clan
Dirty Crew Mc
S.A.W. Boy MC

Bluegrass Brotherhood Louisville Ky
The Originals Mc
 Viking Tribe Mc

Clubs with similar names
A number of one percenter motorcycle clubs are called the "Outlaws". These are not part of the AOA and share only the name, having a different patch design and colors. In some countries, independent Outlaw MCs have joined, or have been "patched over" to the now worldwide club.

The Outlaws MC of New Zealand, established in Napier in 1968, have since "patched over" to the international club

Rivalries between clubs 
Rivalries between outlaw motorcycle clubs have existed for decades. One of the Outlaws’ most noteworthy rivals are the Hell's Angels. A 1991 Department of Justice report identified that the Outlaws were at war with the Hell's Angels over control of narcotics operations as well as territory, and the Sons of Silence, an ally of the Hell's Angels. These rivalries lead to violence, especially between members of rival gangs. Instances of this include everything from stabbings, to car bombings, and even more obscure strategies such as attacks with a pool cue. Nevertheless, tensions are high between clubs when their territory or grasp on the industry is challenged by another. Similar conflict can be seen today between the Hell's Angels and the Bandidos.

Since 2019 the Outlaws Motorcycle Club has been dealing with conflict between the Pagans and Mongols MC, across the United States.

Membership 
The following five criteria are considered when evaluating an aspiring Outlaws member:

 Owns and rides a Harley-Davidson
 Is competent in the mechanics of motorcycles
 Lives a lifestyle congruent with biker subculture and “treats other righteous bikers as bros”
 Is viewed by society as male, heterosexual and masculine in “outlook, behavior, and sexual orientation”
 Does not conform to “worldly values” but instead conforms to the lifestyle of the club

1%er motorcycle clubs pride themselves on their exclusivity, so the evaluation process is extensive and aspiring members must earn the trust of current members in order to be welcomed into the club. Another way to gain membership is to have an entire club get annexed by the Outlaws. This benefits the Outlaws as well as the smaller group by allowing them to expand their territory and control more metropolitan areas.

Criminal allegations and incidents

United States

Connecticut
The Enfield, CT police raided a property belonging to the Outlaws on November 9, 2021. This raid was in relation to the August 5th homicide of 38 year old Jason Comes, in the neighboring town of Somers, CT.

Florida
The FBI's Ten Most Wanted Fugitive#453, Taco Bowman, known World Leader of the AOA, in prison since 1999 for three murders, was the international president of the Outlaws Motorcycle Club. During the time that Bowman was a fugitive in 1998, it had chapters in more than 30 cities in the United States and some 20 chapters in at least four other countries. In 2001 he was tried in Jacksonville, Florida,
Federal agents along with the Daytona Beach SWAT Team raided the Outlaws clubhouse on Beach Street in Daytona Beach, Florida looking for drugs, weapons, contraband, paraphernalia, etc.; they tore the Daytona Beach clubhouse apart for the better part of the day and found nothing, but removed as many of the club's pictures and any other possibly identifying information as they could find. Federal agents also raided a home in Ormond Beach and two other clubhouses around the state. The search of the Jacksonville clubhouses netted federal agents 60 weapons including pocket and kitchen knives.

U.S. Attorney General Alberto Gonzales announced a Detroit grand jury indictment of 16 of the Outlaws National Club's members. The Detroit grand jury indictment included various charges, including assault and drug distribution. Eleven Outlaws leaders and high-ranking members of the gang were arrested after a five-year investigation. The FBI said several gang members were charged with conspiracy to commit assault on members of the Hells Angels Motorcycle Club in Indiana.

Members of the 69ers motorcycle gang killed Paul Anderson (president of the Cross Bayou Chapter in Pasco County, FL) in a targeted shooting, while Anderson was idling in a truck at a red light. Three members of the 69ers were arrested in December 2017 in connection to the killing.

Georgia
Frank Rego Vital of Roberta, Georgia, an Outlaws MC member, was shot and killed in an early morning gunfight June 24, 2007 in the parking lot of The Crazy Horse Saloon strip club in Forest Park, Georgia by two members of the Renegades MC in what has been described as a self-defense shooting after Vital and other Outlaws members followed the men from the club. Both Renegade members were shot several times but survived.

Illinois
The United States Department of Justice has stated that the Outlaws have been criminally associated with the Chicago Outfit.

On July 30, 2008, several facilities associated with the Outlaws in the Chicago area were raided by agents from the FBI and the ATF. The FBI brought in a SWAT team and an urban assault vehicle to the clubhouse in the west side of the city in case violence were to break out.

Indiana
On July 11, 2012, U.S. Marshals raided the Indianapolis Outlaws Chapter clubhouse and arrested 42 members for crimes ranging from mail fraud to money laundering. Law enforcement agencies conducted the raids at dawn in an attempt to catch members off guard. U.S. Attorney Joe Hogsett said their offenses included using violence to collect debts and illegal gambling operations.

Maine
On June 15, 2010 the ATF surrounded the home of Thomas "Tomcat" Mayne. Gunfire was exchanged with the ATF, ultimately killing Mayne. The ATF was there to serve a federal search warrant for an indictment that included Mayne and 26 other members of the Outlaws, for RICO charges and for the shooting of a member of the rival Hells Angels. Michael Elie, owner of Pins & Needles Tattoo shop is now the President of the chapter.

Massachusetts
On August 28, 2009 a former president of the Brockton, Massachusetts Chapter of the Outlaws Motorcycle Club was sent to jail for 262 months, for charges of conspiracy to possess with intent to distribute more than five kilograms of cocaine.

On June 15, 2010 27 members of the Outlaws Motorcycle Club were arrested in Massachusetts on various charges such as attempted murder, racketeering, and other violent crimes.

New Hampshire
On June 27, 2005 Christopher Legere of Raymond, New Hampshire, an Outlaws Sergeant-at-Arms, was arrested in the murder of a man who was wearing a Hells Angels shirt.

Pennsylvania
On March 17, 2009, 22 people—including a correctional officer—were charged in connection with a $3.6 million cocaine distribution ring operated by members and "wannabes" of the Outlaws Motorcycle Club in Luzerne County, Pennsylvania.

On August 24, 2009, 15 members of the Outlaws Philadelphia chapter were arrested in connection with a methamphetamine ring. Those arrested included chapter president Thomas "The Boss" Zaroff and Lonzo "Death Row" Smith According to Pennsylvania District Attorney Tom Corbett, the club sold methamphetamine in Philadelphia, Bucks, Montgomery, Chester, and Delaware counties in Pennsylvania and in Camden and Burlington counties in New Jersey.

Tennessee
On January 1, 2010, the Knox County Sheriff's Office in conjunction with the Knoxville Police Department raided a house located at 205 Clifton Road to serve two arrest warrants and execute a search warrant on the property, alleged to be an Outlaw clubhouse. Officers, including members of the SWAT team, raided the facility just before midnight but found only a handful of elderly club members, who surrendered quickly and peacefully. Knox County Sheriff James Jones acted on information from an undercover informant who said many of the members of the club would be present at the informal celebration of New Year's Eve. Arrest warrants had been issued for Mark "Ivan" Lester and Kenneth Foster for their alleged roles in a confrontation with the undercover informant earlier in December 2009.  The informant had infiltrated the organization over 14 months previous. According to Sheriff Jones, Lester and Foster allegedly threatened the informant with a pistol and demanded the colors in his possession. By Club bylaws, Club colors always remain the property of the Club and not of the individual member. The informant claimed to be in fear of his safety, and submitted to the men's demands. Mark Lester is alleged to be the Regional President in charge of the clubs operations in the states of Kentucky and Tennessee.

Both Lester and Foster were arrested at the residence and were charged with aggravated robbery and aggravated kidnapping. Upon search of the residence the officers found a few legally owned handguns and small amounts of marijuana. They alleged they had evidence of other illegal activities. Both men were jailed and held in lieu of 3 million dollar bonds. Other than the charges stemming from the club's unmasking of the undercover officer, however, no other charges have been filed.

All charges against Mark Lester and Kenneth Foster were later dropped.

Virginia
On June 15, 2010, a grand jury in Virginia indicted 27 Outlaws members on various charges under the Racketeer Influenced and Corrupt Organizations Act (RICO) related to participating in a criminal enterprise that engaged in assaults, kidnapping, drug dealing, illegal gambling, and attempted murder.

United Kingdom
On August 12, 2007, Hells Angel Gerry Tobin, a Canadian living in Mottingham, London, was shot dead on the M40 motorway while returning from the Bulldog Bash festival held near Long Marston, Warwickshire. He was singled out at random by members of the Outlaws. In November 2008, seven members of the Warwickshire chapter were convicted of his murder and sentenced to life imprisonment.

On January 20, 2008, there was a brawl between up to 30 of the rival clubs at Birmingham International Airport. Police recovered various weapons including knuckledusters, hammers and a meat cleaver. Four Outlaw members and three Hells Angels were imprisoned for six years each. Increased security at the court, for the period of the trial, cost around £1 million.

Belgium

In April 2000 full-patch member Jan Wouters was killed by Outlaw André Renard in the presence of two other Outlaws on the club's domain in Mechelen. All three members were given life sentences for the murder of their fellow Outlaw. Among them was the brother-in-law of the victim. According to the three convicted Outlaws the murder took place after an argument escalated. Upon escalation Wouters supposedly aimed a gun at his brother-in-law after which he himself was killed. It was largely believed that the murder was not the result of an escalated discussion, but rather an execution approved by the club's hierarchy.

On October 4, 2009 several Hells Angels and allied Red Devils performed a raid on an Outlaw MC clubhouse in Kortrijk. Shots were fired and three Outlaws were wounded before the Hells Angels and their Red Devils comrades fled the scene. The incident occurred after members of the Outlaws MC supposedly pushed over a motorcycle belonging to Red Devils MC president Johan F. in Moeskroen. The raid is also thought to be a part of a territorial dispute between the Hells Angels and the Red Devils on one side and the Outlaws on the other. Several months before the raid, on the 24th of July 2009, members of the Red Devils and Hells Angels already retaliated by setting fire to motorcycles outside an Outlaw clubhouse. Eventually six Hells Angels and two Red Devils were convicted for attempted murder and given sentences from five to twenty years in prison.

On May 21, 2011 one full-patch member, one prospect, and one sympathizer of the Belgium Outlaws MC were shot and killed by rival bikers of the Belgian Hells Angels. The killings took place in Eisden, not far from Maasmechelen where the Outlaws had opened a new clubhouse just several days earlier. Two days after the murders several Hells Angels were linked to the murder and arrested, including the president of the 'Zwartberg' chapter. The funeral of the full-patch member, Freddy Put, was joined by some 200 Outlaws from across Europe. The investigation concerning the murders in Eisden is ongoing and is made difficult because within both the Hells Angels and the Outlaws there is a code of silence called 'omerta'. In a response to these murders the Belgian Army is investigating the possibility of removing members of criminal MC's from their ranks since two of the primary suspects were paracommandos.

On the night of 24 December 2012, during a rock concert in Dilsen-Stokkem, members of the Hells Angels were attacked by members of the Outlaws MC. Several Hells Angels were inside the Nieuwenborgh hall listening to the evening's last rock band finishing their final songs when, at about 1:30 a.m. by local time, several Outlaws armed with expandable batons (illegal in Belgium) arrived at the scene. The situation quickly escalated into a brawl with three wounded as a result. The police quickly arrived at the scene in large numbers. One of the wounded was a 41-year-old man who suffered an open fracture to the leg.

Canada
The Outlaws entered Canada on 1 July 1977 when a number of Satan's Choice chapters under the leadership of Garnet McEwen "patched over" to join the Outlaws. The Outlaws remained the largest club in Ontario until 2000. On 15 February 1978, two Outlaws were shot outside of a Montreal bar, sparking a biker war with the Hells Angels that lasted until 1984.

In 1981, Satan's Choice made an alliance with the Lobos and the Chosen Few gangs against the Outlaws. On 17 July 1983, a bus carrying two Hells Angels was shot up in Wawa by a group of Outlaws led by Mario Parente. On 17 September 1983, an Outlaw, David Eugene Séquin, went on a shooting rampage when he stormed into the clubhouse of the Chosen Few in Emeryville. Séquin killed three people and wounded three more. One of those he killed was the national president of the Chosen Few, Edward Bruce Morris. In 1984, the Outlaws entered Toronto when their national president, Stanley "Beamer" McConnery, persuaded the Iron Hawgs gang to "patch over" to the Outlaws. In July 1985, Séquin, who had fled to the United States, was killed in a shoot-out with the police in Steger, Illinois, when he chose to resist arrest.

On 25 September 2002, the Outlaws were the subject of Project Retire by the Ontario Provincial Police that saw 56 Outlaws arrested. On 15 April 2007, Marcus Cornelisse was questioned by the police about whatever he violated his bail conditions, leading him to attack and beat two police officers.  Corelisse was arrested the next day. Cornelisse made a plea bargain with the Crown that he was serve a year in prison for assaulting the two police officers in exchange for which he was forbidden to associate with other Outlaws.  William Mellow, the Outlaw national secretary, was found to have on his farm a loaded 10-mm handgun, 50 rounds of ammunition, a 12-gauge shotgun and $11, 065 dollars in cash hidden in his Cadillac. In exchange for a plea bargain, Mellow pleaded guilty to having a handgun without a license in exchange for which he accepted he was not to associate with other Outlaws. With the exceptions of the Outlaw national president, Mario Parente and Luis Fereiria, all of the Outlaws arrested in Project Retire made plea bargains, which crippled the Outlaws.

New Zealand
The previously unrelated Outlaws MC in Napier, New Zealand "patched over" to join the Outlaws in 2014. On March 29, 2021 the national president of the Outlaws, Peter "China" Lui was murdered outside the Napier club house. Less than two months later, Outlaws member Seth Forde was arrested and later convicted of possessing firearms and explosives 'for protection' after the earlier murder.

See also
List of outlaw motorcycle clubs
Criminal Law (Criminal Organisations Disruption) Amendment Act 2013
Harry Joseph Bowman

References

Further reading
 Indiana Drug Threat Assessment

.

 United States v. Bowman, 302 F.3d 1228, 1232 (11th Cir., 2002)
 Article from the Union Leader on the search for Christopher Legere

External links
 Outlaws Motorcycle Club American website
 Outlaws Motorcycle Club world website

 
Organizations established in 1935
Outlaw motorcycle clubs
Gangs in Belgium
Gangs in the United Kingdom
Gangs in the United States
Gangs in Florida
Gangs in Illinois
Gangs in Chicago
Gangs in Massachusetts
Gangs in Detroit
Gangs in New Jersey
Gangs in Pennsylvania
Gangs in Philadelphia
Motorcycle clubs in the United States
McCook, Illinois
Organised crime groups in Ireland
Transnational organized crime

da:Outlaws MC
fi:Rikollinen moottoripyöräkerho